The Belgian Open Championships and originally known as the Belgian International Championships and Belgian Championships  was a men's tennis tournament played in Brussels, Belgium.

History
Originally called the Belgian International Championships established in 1899 continued for 72 editions until 1981. The championships were not staged during World War I or World War II. The event was part of the amateur men's and women's tour from 1899 until 1967 It continued in to the open era in 1968 when it was rebranded as the Belgian Open Championships until 1970 when it was part of the ITF independent tournament tour. In 1971 as part of the Grand Prix tennis circuit from 1971 to 1972 and then from 1977 to 1981 when the tournament was known as the Belgian Open.  It was played on outdoor clay.

Past finals

Singles

Doubles

External links
 Tennisbase tournament roll of honour

Brussels
Brussels
Brussels
Defunct tennis tournaments in Europe
Defunct sports competitions in Belgium
1899 establishments in Belgium
Recurring sporting events established in 1899
1981 disestablishments in Belgium
Recurring sporting events disestablished in 1981